Raccoon Creek is located in northwestern Pennsylvania just west of West Springfield in Erie County.  Its mouth opens into Lake Erie not far from the Ohio border. Raccoon Creek Park is a township picnic area located just to the east of the creeks.

Course
Raccoon Creek rises in a pond on the Conneaut Creek divide about 2 miles south of West Springfield, Pennsylvania and then flows northeast and turns north-northwest to join Lake Erie about 6 miles north of West Springfield, Pennsylvania.

Watershed
Raccoon Creek drains  of area, receives about 41.9 in/year of precipitation, has a wetness index of 499.60, and is about 53.74% forested.

See also
List of rivers of Pennsylvania

References

External links
U.S. Geological Survey: PA stream gaging stations
Pennsylvania Fish and Boat Commission

Rivers of Pennsylvania
Tributaries of Lake Erie
Rivers of Erie County, Pennsylvania